Bojan Krstović (born November 1, 1980) is a Serbian professional basketball player who last played for Kragujevački Radnički. He is a 1.94 m (6 ft 5 in) tall shooting guard.

Professional career
He began playing basketball at the age of 15 in KK Buducnost Peć. His professional career began in KK Borac Čačak, where he spent two seasons (2001–02, 2002–03). From there he opened the door to FMP Železnik. With a team from the Belgrade for five years (2003-2008) won all his trophies - 2004 and 2006 the first place in the Adriatic League, in 2005 and 2007 Kup Radivoja Koraća. In 2008 signed with Hemofarm where he stayed till 2011 when he signed with KK Budućnost Podgorica. In August 2012, he signed with Radnički Kragujevac.

Serbian national team
Krstović was a member of the university Serbia and Montenegro national team at Universiade 2003 and there he won a gold medal.

External links
 Bojan Krstović at aba-liga.com
 Eurobasket.com Profile

1980 births
Living people
ABA League players
Basketball League of Serbia players
KK Borac Čačak players
KK Budućnost players
KK Dynamic players
KK FMP (1991–2011) players
KK Metalac Valjevo players
KK Hemofarm players
KK Radnički Kragujevac (2009–2014) players
KK Tamiš players
KKK Radnički players
Kosovo Serbs
Serbian men's basketball players
Serbian expatriate basketball people in Italy
Serbian expatriate basketball people in Montenegro
Shooting guards
Sportspeople from Peja
Universiade medalists in basketball
Universiade gold medalists for Serbia and Montenegro
Medalists at the 2003 Summer Universiade